White Pony is a 1999 American-Irish children's film directed by Brian Kelly and starring Olivier Gruner and Warwick Davis. It was from the studio Concorde Anois.

It was filmed at Roger Corman's studios near Galway, Ireland.

Cast
Olivier Gruner 
Warwick Davis

References

External links
White Pony at Letterbox DVD
White Pony at IMDb

1999 films
Irish children's films
1990s English-language films